Donacaula tripunctellus is a moth in the family Crambidae. It was described by Robinson in 1870. It is found in North America, where it has been recorded from Arkansas, Florida, Louisiana, Mississippi, Oklahoma and Texas.

The length of the forewings is 20–25 mm. The forewings are pale yellow, irrorated (sprinkled) with brown scales. The hindwings are yellowish white. Adults have been recorded on wing in January, from April to September and in November.

References

Moths described in 1870
Schoenobiinae